Unmarried is a 2020 Nigerian romantic TV series about three single ladies who despite their differences are friends. It is a series film that is shown on Africa Magic.

Premier 
The TV series was premiered on 12 January on Africa Magic shows by 9pm

Cast 
Venita Akpofure as Nengi 
Helen Enado Odigie as Funbi
Ada Afoluwake Ogunkeye as Kamsi

Synopsis 
Three single ladies who grew up on the same street had to go through life such as romance, relationships and childbirth.

References 

Nigerian television series
2020 Nigerian television series debuts
Africa Magic original programming